Paul Conroy may refer to:

Paul Conroy (music executive), a UK music executive
Paul Conroy (Gaelic footballer), Gaelic footballer who plays for Galway
Paul Conroy (journalist), British press photographer working for The Sunday Times who was injured during the 2012 Siege of Homs
a movie character